Raj Mehta is an Indian film director and screenwriter who has directed films like Good Newwz (2019) and Jugjugg Jeeyo (2022).

Filmography
 Good Newwz (2019)
 Ajeeb Daastaans (2021)
 Jugjugg Jeeyo (2022)
 Selfiee (2023)

References

External links
 

Living people
Indian male screenwriters
Hindi-language film directors
21st-century Indian film directors
Film directors from Mumbai
Year of birth missing (living people)